Grafenschachen is a municipality in Burgenland in the district of Oberwart in Austria.

Geography
Parts of the municipality are Grafenschachen and Kroisegg.

Population

Transportation
The nearest train station is located in the town of Pinkafeld, with links to Vienna and the rest of Europe.

Politics
Of the 19 positions on the municipal council, the SPÖ has 12, the ÖVP 6, and the FPÖ 1.

References

Cities and towns in Oberwart District